Ansty Coombe is a hamlet in Ansty parish, southwest Wiltshire, England.

Sources
 

Hamlets in Wiltshire